Sar Tappeh (also known as Sar Tappeh-ye ‘Olyā, Seh Tepe, and Sih Tepe) is a village in Shirvan Rural District, in the Central District of Borujerd County, Lorestan Province, Iran. At the 2006 census, its population was 158, in 34 families.

References 

Towns and villages in Borujerd County